Gérard Raoul Rouzier was a Haitian lawyer and former member of the FIFA Executive Committee.

Rouzier is arguably the most acclaimed football administrator to represent Haiti on the international level.

Career
Rouzier served as assessor for FIFA (1944–1946), FHF President (1960–1966), Member of the Executive Committee and Vice President of CONCACAF (1961–1972), Member of the FIFA Executive Committee (1972–1976), Vice President of the Haitian Olympic Committee (1962–1977?) and was on the Disciplinary Committee of the 1976 Summer Olympics.

Rouzier was the inaugural appointed minister of Ministry of Youth and Sports.

Notes

References

FIFA officials
Haitian sportspeople
Haitian people of Mulatto descent
20th-century Haitian lawyers
Government ministers of Haiti